Tamar Yellin (born 1963) is an author and teacher who lives in Yorkshire. Her first novel, The Genizah at the House of Shepher, won the 2007 Sami Rohr Prize for Jewish Literature.

Biography
Tamar Yellin was born and raised in Leeds. Her father was a third-generation native of Jerusalem; his father was Yitzhak Yaakov Yellin (1885–1964), one of the pioneers of the Hebrew language press in Palestine. Her mother was the daughter of a Polish immigrant to England.

Yellin attended the Leeds Girls' High School. She studied biblical and modern Hebrew language and Arabic language at the University of Oxford.

She spent 13 years writing her first novel, The Genizah at the House of Shepher (2005), and took two years to find a publisher. This was followed by a collection of 13 short stories, Kafka in Brontëland (2006) and another novel, Tales of the Ten Lost Tribes (2008). She also writes fiction for magazines, including The London Magazine and the Jewish Quarterly, and has published stories in two anthologies, The Slow Mirror and Other Stories: New Fiction by Jewish Writers (1996) and Mordecai's First Brush with Love: New Stories by Jewish Women in Britain (2004).

Yellin is a teacher for the Interfaith Education Center, in which capacity she speaks to non-Jewish schoolchildren about Jewish religious practices.

Writing style

Yellin incorporates much of her own personal history in her work. The plot for her first novel, The Genizah at the House of Shepher was based on her family's discovery of historic notes on the Aleppo Codex in the attic of their home.

Prizes
2007 Sami Rohr Prize for Jewish Literature, for The Genizah at the House of Shepher. The prize money was $100,000.
2007 Reform Judaism Prize for Jewish Fiction, for her short-story collection, Kafka in Bronteland
2006 Harold U. Ribalow Prize, for The Genizah at the House of Shepher

Bibliography

References

External links
 "A Jew in Brontëland" Jewish Quarterly, Winter 2007
 "Jerusalem Comes to Yorkshire" The Guardian, 2006 review of Kafka in Brontëland

21st-century English novelists
1963 births
Living people
Alumni of the University of Oxford
English Jewish writers
Writers from Leeds
English people of Israeli descent